
Osterby may refer to:

People
H.C. Østerby (born 1955), Danish politician
Fie Østerby (born 1992), Danish professional racing cyclist

Places
Osterby, Rendsburg-Eckernförde, municipality in Rendsburg-Eckernförde district, Schleswig-Holstein, Germany
Osterby, Schleswig-Flensburg, municipality in Schleswig-Flensburg district, Schleswig-Holstein, Germany
Österby, village in Noarootsi Parish, Lääne County, Estonia
Østerby, Denmark, village in Jammerbugt Municipality, Denmark

Other uses
Osterby Man (died 75 AD), bog body from Iron Age discovered in Germany

See also
Österbybruk, a locality situated in Östhammar Municipality, Uppsala County, Sweden